Humaitá may refer to the following:

Places
Humaitá, a town in the department of Ñeembucú, Paraguay
Humaitá, Rio Grande do Sul, a town in the Brazilian state of Rio Grande do Sul
Humaitá, Rio de Janeiro, a residential district in Rio de Janeiro, Brazil
Humaitá, Porto Alegre, a district in the town of Porto Alegre, Brazil
Humaitá, Amazonas, a town in the Brazilian state of Amazonas
Humaitá Airport, serving the Amazonas town
Humaitã River, a river in southern Brazil.

Military
Fortress of Humaitá, a strategic defence system in Paraguay, 1854–1868
 Passage of Humaitá, the 1868 naval operation during the Paraguayan War in which the fortress was bypassed by the Brazilian fleet
 Siege of Humaitá, the 1868 military operation during the Paraguayan War in which the fortress was taken
Humaitá-class gunboat, a type of vessel used in the Chaco War by the Paraguayan Navy
 Several submarines of the Brazilian Navy have been named after the Passage

Animals
Humaita antbird, a species of bird in the family Thamnophlidae.